The Rabbit Man is a 1990 Swedish drama-psychological thriller directed by Stig Larsson, about a rapist whose father unknowingly investigates his crimes for a commercial television programme. The film sparked controversy because of its nude scenes and difficult subject, handled with an unconventional narrative style.

The title refers to a nickname given by newspapers to a real rapist Larsson read about in the 1970s, who lured young girls into his apartment by telling them he was keeping rabbits there that he wanted to save from being exposed to animal testing.

Börje Ahlstedt won the award for Best Actor for his part as the rapist's father at the 26th Guldbagge Awards.

Selected cast
 Leif Andrée - Hans Nääs
 Börje Ahlstedt - Bengt Nääs
 Stina Ekblad - Lollo
 Eva Engström - Maud
 Björn Gedda - Gunnar Dahlgren
 Erika Ullenius - Carla
 Krister Henriksson - Alexandersson
 Johan Rabaeus - Thommy

Production
The boys and girls appearing in the gym and locker room scenes weren't professional actors but real students at Kvarnbackaskolan in Kista, Stockholm.
In the sequence in which Leif Andrée's character is bullied by his pupils, Stig Larsson made it clear that the boys had to hit Andrée as hard as they wanted. "We managed it on the first shot. They hit me and threw the ball in my head. It was really violent. I had a sore ass for several weeks afterwards," Andrée said.

References

External links
 

1990 films
1990 drama films
Swedish drama films
1990s Swedish-language films
1990s Swedish films